The 2020 Deauville American Film Festival was the 46th edition of the Deauville American Film Festival, held at Deauville, France from September 4 to 13, 2020. The festival was held in spite of the COVID-19 pandemic.

French singer and actress Vanessa Paradis was appointed as the President of the Jury. The festival paid tribute to Kirk Douglas. The Grand Special Prize was awarded to The Nest directed by Sean Durkin. The Nest film was also awarded with the International Critics' prize and the Revelation Prize.

Juries

Main Competition
 Vanessa Paradis: singer and actress (President of Jury) 
 Yann Gonzalez : director
 Zita Hanrot : actress 
 Delphine Horvilleur : journalist
 Vincent Lacoste : actor
 Mounia Meddour : actress 
 Bruno Podalydès : actor, director
 Oxmo Puccino : hip hop musician

Revelation jury
 Rebecca Zlotowski: French film director and screenwriter (President of Jury)  
 Luàna Bajrami : actress, director
 Mya Bollaers : actress
 Arnaud Rebotini : composer, musician
 Antoine Reinartz : actor

Programme

Competition
The Assistant by Kitty Green
First Cow by Kelly Reichardt
Giants Being Lonely by Grear Patterson
Holler by Nicole Riegel
Kajillionaire by Miranda July
Last Words by Jonathan Nossiter
Lorelei by Sabrina Doyle
Love is Love is Love by Eleanor Coppola
Minari by Lee Isaac Chung
Shiva Baby by Emma Seligman
Sophie Jones by Jessie Barr
Sound of Metal by Darius Marder
Uncle Frank by Alan Ball
The Violent Heart by Kerem Sanga
 The Nest by Sean Durkin

Les Premières (Premieres)
 How I Became a Super Hero by Douglas Attal
 Critical Thinking by John Leguizamo
 Wendy by Benh Zeitlin
 Bad Education by Cory Finley
 Don't Tell a Soul by Alex McAulay
 Resistance by Jonathan Jakubowicz
 Sons of Philadelphia by Jérémie Guez
 The Professor and the Madman by Farhad Safinia
 Wander by April Mullen

Les Docs De L'Oncle Sam (Uncle Sam's Doc)
 Billie by James Erskine
 Kubrick by Kubrick by Gregory Monro
 Leap of Faith : William Friedkin on The exorcist by Alexandre O. Philippe
 Deauville et le rêve américain by Daphné Baiwir
 Kirk Douglas, l'indompté by Hubert Attal
 Pierre & Lescure de Maxime Switek and Philippe Lézin
 The Last Hillbilly by Diane-Sara Bouzgarrou and Thomas Jenkoe
 Weed & Wine by Rebecca Richman Cohen

Tribute to Kirk Douglas 
 The Final Countdown by Don Taylor
 Seven Days in May by John Frankenheimer
 Lonely Are the Brave by David Miller
 Spartacus by Stanley Kubrick
 The Vikings by Richard Fleischer
 Paths of Glory by Stanley Kubrick 
 Lust for Life by Vincente Minnelli and Georges Cukor
 The Bad and the Beautiful by Vincente Minnelli
 The Big Sky by Howard Hawks
 Ace in the Hole by Billy Wilder
 Champion by Mark Robson
 Out of the Past by Jacques Tourneur

Awards
Grand Prix (Grand Special Prize): The Nest by Sean Durkin
Prix du Jury (Jury Special Prize): (tied) First Cow by Kelly Reichardt and Lorelei by Sabrina Doyle
Prix du Public (Audience Award): Uncle Frank by Alan Ball
Prix de la Critique Internationale (International Critics' prize): The Nest by Sean Durkin
Prix Michel d'Ornano (Michel d'Ornano Award for debut French film): Slalom by Charlène Favier
Prix de la Révélation (Revelation Prize): The Nest by Sean Durkin

References

External links
 Official site

2020 film festivals

21st century in France

2020 in French cinema
2020 festivals in Europe
Film festivals in France